KK Mladost may refer to the following basketball teams:

Bosnia and Herzegovina
 KK Mladost Mrkonjić Grad, based in Mrkonjić Grad
 KK Mladost 1976, based in Prnjavor
 KK Mladost Bosanski Petrovac, based in Bosanski Petrovac
 KK Mladost Gacko, based in Gacko
 KK Mladost Kotor Varoš, based in Kotor Varoš
 KK Mladost Rogatica, based in Rogatica
 KK Mladost Široki Brijeg, based in Široki Brijeg (1974–1992); later renamed to HKK Široki

Croatia
 HAKK Mladost, based in Zagreb
 KK Mladost Čačinci, based in Čačinci, Virovitica-Podravina County
 KK Mladost Đurđevac, based in Đurđevac, Koprivnica-Križevci County

Montenegro
 KK Mladost Nikšić, based in Nikšić (1962–1966); later renamed to KK Sutjeska

Serbia
 KK Mladost Zemun, based in Zemun (1954–present)
 KK Mladost SP, based in Smederevska Palanka (1970–present)
 KK Mladost Čačak, based in Čačak (1995–present)
 KK Mladost Aleksinac, based in Aleksinac (1957–1976); later renamed to KK Napredak Aleksinac
 KK Mladost Vršac, based in Vršac (1959–1967); later renamed to KK Vršac
 KK Mladost Palanka, based in Smederevska Palanka (2007–2014), later renamed to KK Radnički 1950
 KK Mladost Veternik, based in Veternik
 KK Mladost Bački Jarak, based in Bački Jarak, Temerin
 KK Mladost Zaječar, based in Zaječar
 KK Mladost Vesna, based in Bela Palanka
 KK Mladost Omoljica, based in Omoljica
 KK Mladost 2014, based in Ub

See also 
 FK Mladost (disambiguation)